José Sacal Micha (25 September 1944 – 4 October 2018) was a Mexican sculptor and ceramist born in Cuernavaca, Morelos. His work has been interpreted as surrealistic.

Early life
As a young man, Sacal studied in the Instituto Regional de Bellas Artes, del Estado de Morelos, Antiguo Molino De Sto. Dominigo, INBA, and with Arthur Khronengold and Enrique Altamirano.

Studies
1965-69 The National Institute of Fine Arts, in Cuernavaca Morelos
1969-72 The Institute of Arts "La Esmeralda"
1973-78 Arthur Kronhnengold's Workshop
1979-82 The National Institute of Fine Arts, in Mexico City
1983-87 Enrique Altamirano's Workshop

Exhibits
In 2008, the Latino Museum of History, Art and Culture in Los Angeles featured an exhibit José Sacal, Contemporary Sculpture from Mexico.

In 2011, "Personajes de impacto y corazones" in the Mexico City Metro.

References

External links

Museum of Tolerance Los Angeles * 

Mexican sculptors
Male sculptors
Mexican ceramists
Mexican surrealist artists
Mexican Jews
1944 births
2018 deaths
People from Cuernavaca
Escuela Nacional de Pintura, Escultura y Grabado "La Esmeralda" alumni